Wen Hao-yun (born 4 November 1995) is a Taiwanese female badminton player.

Achievements

BWF International Challenge/Series
Mixed Doubles

 BWF International Challenge tournament
 BWF International Series tournament
 BWF Future Series tournament

References

External links
 

Taiwanese female badminton players
1995 births
Living people
Universiade medalists in badminton
Universiade gold medalists for Chinese Taipei
Medalists at the 2017 Summer Universiade
21st-century Taiwanese women